Martha Langbein (born 22 May 1941 in Heidelberg) is a West German athlete who competed mainly in the 100 metres.

She competed for the United Team of Germany in the 1960 Summer Olympics held in Rome, Italy in the 4 x 100 metres where she won the Silver medal with her team mates Anni Biechl, Brunhilde Hendrix and Jutta Heine.

References

Sports Reference

1941 births
Living people
German female sprinters
Athletes (track and field) at the 1960 Summer Olympics
Athletes (track and field) at the 1964 Summer Olympics
Olympic athletes of the United Team of Germany
Olympic silver medalists for the United Team of Germany
Medalists at the 1960 Summer Olympics
Olympic silver medalists in athletics (track and field)
Olympic female sprinters
Sportspeople from Heidelberg